Alfred Ernest "Alf" Rainbow (1 April 1900 – 17 December 1963) was a rugby union player who represented Australia.

Rainbow, a fly-half, was born in London and claimed 1 international rugby cap for Australia.

References

Australian rugby union players
Australia international rugby union players
1900 births
1963 deaths
Rugby union players from London
Rugby union fly-halves